Silvio Herklotz (born 6 May 1994 in Blankenfelde-Mahlow) is a German former cyclist, who rode professionally between 2013 and 2018 for the ,  and  teams. He competed in one Grand Tour during his career – the 2016 Vuelta a España – but he failed to finish. Herklotz's retirement was following a diagnosis for lyme disease; he moved into a business role post-retirement.

Major results

2011
 5th Overall Giro della Lunigiana
 6th Road race, UEC European Junior Road Championships
 8th Junior race, UCI Cyclo-cross World Championships
2012
 2nd Overall Giro della Lunigiana
1st Points classification
1st Mountains classification
1st Stages 2, 3 & 4
 2nd Overall GP Général Patton
 7th Junior race, UCI Cyclo-cross World Championships
 9th Road race, UEC European Junior Road Championships
2013
 1st  Road race, National Under-23 Road Championships
 1st  Overall Tour Alsace
1st Young rider classification
1st Stage 5
 1st  Young rider classification Szlakiem Grodów Piastowskich
 2nd Giro del Belvedere
 2nd Gran Premio Palio del Recioto
 4th Overall Istrian Spring Trophy
 4th Eschborn–Frankfurt Under–23
 8th Road race, UCI Under-23 Road World Championships
 8th Overall Thüringen Rundfahrt der U23
2014
 1st Gran Premio Palio del Recioto
 2nd Giro del Belvedere
 3rd Overall Szlakiem Grodów Piastowskich
1st  Young rider classification
 6th Overall Tour de Luxembourg
 8th Overall Rhône-Alpes Isère Tour
1st Young rider classification
 9th Road race, UCI Under-23 Road World Championships
 10th Road race, UEC European Under-23 Road Championships
2015
 1st  Points classification Tour of Małopolska
 2nd Liège–Bastogne–Liège U23
 3rd Overall Istrian Spring Trophy
 5th Overall Carpathian Couriers Race
 5th Giro del Belvedere
 7th Overall Szlakiem Grodów Piastowskich
1st  Young rider classification
 10th Trofeo Banca Popolare di Vicenza
2016
 9th Overall Oberösterreich Rundfahrt
 10th Overall Tour d'Azerbaïdjan
2017
 4th Overall Czech Cycling Tour

Grand Tour general classification results timeline

References

External links

1994 births
Living people
German male cyclists
People from Teltow-Fläming
Cyclists from Brandenburg